The 2018–19 National Premier League is the 45th season of the National Premier League, the top division football competition in Jamaica. The season began on 16 September 2018 and will end on 29 April 2019. Portmore United are the defending champions, having won their 6th title last season.

Teams 
Sandals South Coast FC and Boys' Town finished 11th and 12th in last season's competition and were relegated to their respective regional Super Leagues, the Western Super League and KSAFA Super League respectively.

At the end of last season, the champions of the four Super Leagues participated in a promotion playoff double round robin tournament. Dunbeholden F.C. and Mount Pleasant Football Academy finished 1st and 2nd after the playoff and were promoted to the National Premier League for this season.

Regular season

Results

Regular Home Games

Additional Home Games

Playoffs

Bracket

Results

Quarterfinals 

Mount Pleasant F.A. progresses 3-2 on aggregate.

Cavalier progresses 3-0 on aggregate.

Semifinals 
The winners of these ties will qualify for the Caribbean Club Championship.

Portmore United progress 3-2 on aggregate.

Waterhouse progresses 3-0 on aggregate.

Third-place game

Finals

Top goalscorers

References

External links
Premier League Jamaica

National Premier League seasons
1
Jamaica